The Marina is a Canadian comedy-drama film, directed by Christophe Levac and Étienne Galloy and released in 2020. The film stars Rémi Goulet as Charlie, a young competitive wakeboarder who has been sidelined by an injury that may prevent him from ever returning to the sport; visiting his cousin in Chambly for the summer, he is shaken out of his aimlessness when he meets and connects with Juliette (Rose-Marie Perreault), a young woman who works at the local marina.

The cast also includes Amadou Madani Tall, Anthony Therrien and Marguerite Bouchard.

The film premiered on August 27, 2020 at both the Fantasia Film Festival in Canada, and the Middlebury New Filmmakers Festival in the United States. It was subsequently screened at the Whistler Film Festival, where Fred Gervais-Dupuis won the Borsos Competition award for Best Cinematography in a Canadian Film.

References

External links

2020 films
2020s coming-of-age comedy-drama films
Canadian coming-of-age comedy-drama films
Films shot in Quebec
Films set in Quebec
Quebec films
2020s French-language films
French-language Canadian films
2020s Canadian films